Quchayuq (Quechua qucha lake, -yuq a suffix, "the one with a lake (or lakes)", also spelled Khochayoj) is a mountain in the Andes of Bolivia which reaches a height of approximately . It is located in the Potosí Department, Nor Chichas Province, Cotagaita Municipality. Quchayuq lies northwest of Achakanayuq.

References 

Mountains of Potosí Department